Saida Haji Bashir Ismail is a Somali politician.

Biography
Saida Ismail is the daughter of Haji Bashir Ismail Yusuf, the first President of the Somali National Assembly during Somalia's early civilian administration. Her brother, Abdullahi Haji Bashir Ismail, is a Deputy Director-General of Somali Immigration & Naturalization, One of the high rank Senior Somali Administration Officers, as well as a writer of Politics and History.

Ismail later also entered politics, serving as Vice-Minister of Finance in the Transitional National Government (TNG) between 2000 and 2004.

Notes

References

Living people
Government ministers of Somalia
Year of birth missing (living people)